Powersville may refer to:

Powersville, Georgia
Powersville, Iowa
Powersville, Kentucky
Powersville, Missouri